Michigan made a substantial contribution to the Union during the American Civil War. While the state itself was far removed from the combat theaters of the war, Michigan supplied many troops and several generals, including George Armstrong Custer. When, at the beginning of the war, Michigan was asked to supply no more than one regiment, Governor Austin Blair sent seven.

Before the war
Before the Civil War, President James Buchanan took a weak position amid a looming South secession crisis. Secretary of State Lewis Cass of Michigan, a 78-year-old elder statesman who had been Michigan's U.S. senator and governor of Michigan Territory, resigned from Buchanan's cabinet in protest, remarking that "he had seen the Constitution born and now feared he was seeing it die".

In December 1860, South Carolina became the first state to secede from the Union. Outgoing Governor Moses Wisner delivered a speech to a Michigan Legislature in defense of the Union and the Constitution, stating: "This is no time for timid and vacillating councils, when the cry of treason and rebellion is ringing in our ears." On January 2, 1861, Austin Blair was sworn in as governor, vowing strong action to maintain the Union and punish secession. The Legislature was also firmly pro-Union; when Virginia invited Michigan to send delegates to the Washington Peace Conference, the Legislature passed a refusal resolution stating that "concessions and compromise are not to be entertained or offered to traitors."

Military contribution
At the beginning of the Civil War, regiments from Michigan were raised to answer Lincoln's call for men. The first volunteers from Michigan were mustered into the Army as the 1st Michigan Infantry on May 1, 1861. On May 16, the regiment arrived in Washington; Lincoln was said to have exclaimed "Thank God for Michigan!" upon the troops' arrival.

Over the course of the war, some 90,000 Michigan men (about 23 percent of the 1860 male population of the state) served in the Union forces. This figure includes some 1,600 black soldiers. Michigan raised a total of 30 infantry regiments, eleven cavalry regiments, one light artillery regiment, two light batteries, two companies of sharpshooters, and the 1st Michigan Engineers. According to Frederick H. Dyer, a total of 14,753 officers and men from Michigan died during the war, but a "Roll of Honor" prepared upon order of the Michigan Legislature in 1869 contains 14,855 names.

Among the more celebrated units was the 24th Michigan Volunteer Infantry, which, as a part of the famed Iron Brigade, suffered considerable losses at the Battle of Gettysburg while defending McPherson's Ridge. George Armstrong Custer's "Michigan Wolverine" Cavalry effectively battled J.E.B. Stuart at Gettysburg on the East Cavalry Field.

Several Union generals hailed from Michigan, including: Custer, Elon J. Farnsworth, Byron Root Pierce, Orlando Metcalfe Poe, Israel Bush Richardson, and Orlando B. Willcox. In a letter to his wife, one Union soldier from Michigan detailed his motivations for fighting for the U.S. in the war, before dying in 1864:

Casualties

14,753 Michigan soldiers died in service, roughly one of every six who served. A total of 4,448 of these deaths were combat deaths while the rest, over 10,000, were from disease, a constant fear in crowded army camps with poor food, sanitation and exposure issues and pre-modern medicine. Michigan suffered the sixth-highest losses among the Union states (the non-state U.S. Colored Troops losses also exceeded Michigan's).

Homefront

Michigan actively participated in the American Civil War sending thousands of volunteers.  A study of the cities of Grand Rapids and Niles shows an overwhelming surge of nationalism in 1861, whipping up enthusiasm for the war in all segments of society, and all political, religious, ethnic, and occupational groups. However, by 1862 the casualties were mounting and the war was increasingly focused on freeing the slaves in addition to preserving the Union. Copperhead Democrats called the war a failure, and although it was attempted to make support for the war more and more a partisan Republican effort, the election of 1864 showed support for the Federal cause remained strong.  Michigan voters overwhelmingly supported the Union: 79,149 (53.60%) to 68,513 (46.40%).

See also
 List of Michigan Civil War Units
 History of Michigan

References

Further  reading
 Bak, Richard. A Distant Thunder: Michigan in the Civil War (2004). 239 pp.
 Bertera, Martin N., and Kim Crawford. The 4th Michigan Infantry in the Civil War (MSU Press, 2010).

 Bratt, Peter. "A Great Revolution in Feeling: The American Civil War in Niles and Grand Rapids, Michigan," Michigan Historical Review vol. 31#2 (2005) pp 43+. online
 Brinks, Herbert. "The Effect of the Civil War in 1861 on Michigan Lumbering and Mining Industries." Michigan History 44 (1960): 101-108.
 Dean, Eric T. " 'A Scene of Surpassing Terror and Awful Grandeur': The Paradoxes of Military Service in the American Civil War." Michigan Historical Review (1995): 37-61. online
 Dempsey, Jack. Michigan and the Civil War: A Great and Bloody Sacrifice (Arcadia Publishing, 2011).
 Dilla, Harriette M. Politics of Michigan, 1865–1878 (Columbia University Press, 1912) online at Google books
 Fennimore, Jean Joy L. "Austin Blair: Civil War Governor, 1861-1862." Michigan History 49.3: 202+.

 Frank, Stephen M. " 'Rendering Aid and Comfort': Images of Fatherhood in the Letters of Civil War Soldiers from Massachusetts and Michigan." Journal of Social History (1992): 5-31. online
 Genco, James. Into the Tornado of War: A History of the Twenty-First Michigan Infantry in the Civil War (Abbott Press, 2012). online

 Hershock, Martin J. "Copperheads and Radicals: Michigan Partisan Politics during the Civil War Era, 1860–1865," Michigan Historical Review 18 (Spring 1992) online
 Hoffman, Mark.  "My Brave Mechanics": The First Michigan Engineers and Their Civil War (Wayne State University Press, 2007).
 Kidd, James Harvey. Personal Recollections of a Cavalryman with Custer's Michigan Cavalry Brigade in the Civil War (Simon and Schuster, 2018), a primary source. excerpt
 Longacre, Edward G. Custer and His  Wolverines: The Michigan Calvary Brigade, 1861–1865 (1997). 

 Mason, Philip, and Paul Pentecost. From Bull Run to Appomattox (Wayne State University Press, 1961), on Michigan combat units.

 Mitchell, Robert E. "Civil War recruiting and recruits from ever-changing labor pools: Midland County, Michigan, as a case study." Michigan Historical Review (2009): 29-60. online
 Rubenstein, Bruce A. and Lawrence E. Ziewacz, Michigan: A History of the Great Lakes State (5th ed., Wiley: 2014). Chapter 7 pp 102-113.
 Sewell, Richard H. "Michigan Farmers and the Civil War." Michigan History 44.4 (1960): 353-375.
 Taylor, Paul. "Old Slow Town": Detroit during the Civil War  (Detroit: Wayne State University Press, 2013). x, 248 pp.
 Williams, Frederick. Michigan Soldiers in the Civil War (Michigan historical Commission, 1960)  
 Woodford, Frank Bury. Father Abraham's Children: Michigan Episodes in the Civil War (Wayne State University Press, 1999).

Historiography
 Miller, Richard F. States at War: A Reference Guide for Michigan in the Civil War (2020) excerpt

 
1860s in Michigan
American Civil War
American Civil War
American Civil War by state